Gonane  is a chemical compound with formula , whose structure consists of four hydrocarbon rings fused  together: three cyclohexane units and one cyclopentane. It can also be viewed as the result of fusing a cyclopentane molecule with a fully hydrogenated molecule of phenanthrene, hence the more descriptive name  perhydrocyclopenta[a]phenanthrene. 

Gonane is a tetracyclic hydrocarbon with no double bonds. It is formally the parent compound of the steroids; its carbon skeleton is called the "steroid nucleus".  Some important gonane derivatives are the steroid hormones, characterized by methyl groups at the C10 and C13 positions and a side chain at the C17 position. 

Because gonane has six centers of chirality, it has 64 (26) theoretically possible stereoisomers, that differ on the position of the lone hydrogens at carbons 5, 8, 9, 10, 13 and 14 in the direction perpendicular to the mean plane of the carbons. However, only a few of these stereoisomers occur in living organisms. The most common are 5α-gonane and 5β-gonane.

Estrane (C18) is the 13β-methyl variant of gonane, androstane (C19) is the 10β,13β-dimethyl variant of gonane, and pregnane (C21) is the 10β,13β-dimethyl, 17β-ethyl variant of gonane.

The term gonane is also used to refer to a group of progestins that are carbon 18-homologated 19-nortestosterone derivatives including levonorgestrel and its analogues. The term is used to distinguish them from the estranes (19-nortestosterone derivatives).

References

Gonanes
Polycyclic nonaromatic hydrocarbons
Steroids